Kirchentellinsfurt is a municipality in the district of Tübingen in Baden-Württemberg in Germany, about 7 km east of the city of Tübingen and 7 km northwest of Reutlingen. Since 2015, Bernd Haug has been the mayor of Kirchentellinsfurt.

Geography

Kirchentellinsfurt lies next to the river Neckar on the edge of the Schönbuch. Near the village, the Echaz river flows into the Neckar. It borders on the towns Altenburg, Reutlingen, Pliezhausen, Wannweil, Kusterdingen und Tübingen.

History

The two settlements Kirchen and Tälisfurt grew together to form Kirchentellinsfurt. Kirchen was first mentioned 1007 in a treaty when it was given to the Archdiocese of Bamberg as a gift. The fusion of the two villages 1275, was the first time Tellinsfurt was mentioned in documents. The village became Protestant when the first Protestant pastor was appointed in 1594.

Many of the older residents of Ann Arbor, Michigan, emigrated from this section of Germany.

Politics

Town council

The town council consists of 14 elected members and its chairman, the mayor. He can vote in the council.

Result of the last election 

Mayor
The mayor is elected for 8 years.

 1949-1979 Richard Wolf
 1979-2014 Bernhard Knaus
 since 1. January 2015: Bernd Haug

Sights
 lake: flooded gravel  for leisure activities such as swimming, surfing or sailings.
 Schlossmuseum (a museum for local history)
 Roman tombstone
 Celtic ruins (Viereckschanze)

References

Tübingen (district)
Populated places on the Neckar basin
Populated riverside places in Germany